Stadionul Ștefan Dobay is a multi-purpose stadium in Dumbrăvița, Romania. It is currently used mostly for football matches, is the home ground of CSC Dumbrăvița and has a capacity of 1,000 people (500 on seats). Since 2018, the stadium is named after a legend of the Romanian football, Ștefan Dobay, who was born in Dumbrăvița.

References

External links
Stadionul Ștefan Dobay at soccerway.com
Stadionul Ștefan Dobay at europlan-online.de

Football venues in Romania
Sport in Timiș County
Buildings and structures in Timiș County